The Blue Generation is a film directed by Garin Nugroho.

The film is about the Indonesian rock band Slank. The group is known for its political lyrics, has been together for 25 years and has a following throughout the country. "Slank" means minority and the community of fans make up something like a movement: the "Slankers" stand for peace, unity, and love, much like the American hippie movement in the 1960s. Part of the film documents a musical by the band that concerns Indonesia's political history. It addresses the country's severe problems and criticizes the government by exposing militarism, the abduction of dissidents, the death penalty, and torture as being the order of the day. The heroes of the musical are the cool winners, the “Blue Generation”, inspiring others with their positive values much like the characters in “Hair”. Nugroho also shows concert clips and Slank fans and enhances his film with comic book-style animated sequences commenting on the political situation in Indonesia. The film paints a multifaceted picture of the Slanker movement and offers a portrait of Indonesian society that is unusual.

References

External links

2009 films
Films shot in Indonesia
Indonesian musical films
2000s musical films